YeTFaSCo (The Yeast Transcription Factor Specificity Compendium) is a database of transcription factors for Saccharomyces cerevisiae.

See also
 Transcription factor

References

External links
 http://yetfasco.ccbr.utoronto.ca/

Biological databases
Gene expression
Transcription factors